Chiba Thermal Power Station, is an operational thermal power station located in Japan, run by JERA, with a maximum output of 4380 MW. Originally built in the late 1950s as a coal-burning plant, it was later converted to a plant burning liquefied natural gas in the year 2000.

History
Chiba Thermal Power Station started operation in the late 1950s as a 600MW capacity coal fired power plant. It had four units, but due to the aging of the facilities and the increasing demand for electricity, in 2000 it was eventually renovated to a combined cycle power plant and fuelled with Liquefied Natural Gas (LNG). Groups 1 & 2 were constructed and this increased the power station to a maximum output of 2880 MW. In 2011, as part of an emergency plan to supply power after the Great East Japan Earthquake, three gas turbine systems were constructed within 4 months. From 2012 to 2014, a more advanced combined cycle system was added as group 3. This had a total output of 1500MW.

Power Generation

When Chiba Thermal Power Station was renovated to a combined cycle power plant, Groups 1 & 2 were constructed. Each has a total power output of 1440 MW. Group 3 was constructed outdoors, as opposed to indoors like Groups 1 & 2, as it needed to be built as quickly as possible after the Great East Japan Earthquake. Group 3 has a power output of 1500MW. The total power output of the station is 4380MW and the site covers approximately 760,000 square metres of land. The fuel used — LNG — is supplied by pipeline from terminals located at Sodegaura Power Station and Futtsu Power Station and it outputs its water into the nearby sea.

Old Power Generation

Group 1 of the initial power station was started in April 1957, and later, more groups were added up to Group 4 in November 1959. Originally, the power station burnt coal, but subsequently switched to crude oil. However, as these facilities were beginning to age, and the demand for electricity was increasing, in 2000, the facilities were renovated and a new combined cycle power generation system was installed.

See also
JERA
List of power stations in Japan

References

Buildings and structures in Chiba (city)
Coal-fired power stations in Japan
Natural gas-fired power stations in Japan
Energy infrastructure completed in 2000
2000 establishments in Japan